Buzalkovo is a village in the municipality of Veles, North Macedonia.

Demographics
On the 1927 ethnic map of Leonhard Schulze-Jena, the village is written as Buselikovo and no ethnic marker was given. 

According to the 2002 census, the village had a total of 1456 inhabitants. Ethnic groups in the village include:
Albanians  1456
 Turks 3
 Macedonians 2
 Others 8

References

External links

Villages in Veles Municipality
Albanian communities in North Macedonia